Eduardo José Saragó Carbón (born 11 January 1982) is a Venezuelan football manager and former player. He is the current manager of Deportivo Táchira.

Career
Born in Caracas, Saragó had brief spells for hometown side Caracas and Italchacao as a player, before retiring. He started working at the youth schools of Fray Luis and San Agustín del Marques, before later taking over the youth sides of Centro Italo Venezolano and then being an assistant manager of the Venezuela national under-20 team.

In 2008, Saragó was appointed manager of Zamora for the Clausura tournament, and led the side to a seventh position. In July of that year, he took over Deportivo Italia, leading the side to the first position in the 2008 Apertura and later losing the Finals to Caracas; he later continued at the club when they changed name to Deportivo Petare in 2010.

Saragó resigned from Petare in May 2011, and was presented as manager of Deportivo Lara on 5 June 2011. On 12 December 2012, despite lifting the trophy in the 2011–12 season with only one loss, he resigned.

On 17 May 2013, Saragó was appointed manager of Caracas. He left on 27 November 2015, after the campaign ended, and was named at the helm of Deportivo La Guaira the following 31 May.

Saragó left La Guaira on a mutual agreement on 7 July 2017, and remained five years without managing before returning to Deportivo Lara on 19 July 2022. Eight days later, however, he resigned after the club's board could not comply with the initially agreed requests.

On 20 August 2022, Saragó replaced Alex Pallarés at the helm of Deportivo Táchira.

Honours
Deportivo Lara
Venezuelan Primera División: 2011–12

Caracas
Copa Venezuela: 2013

References

External links

1982 births
Living people
People from Caracas
Venezuelan football managers
Venezuelan Primera División managers
Zamora F.C. managers
Asociación Civil Deportivo Lara managers
Caracas FC managers
Deportivo La Guaira managers
Deportivo Táchira F.C. managers
Deportivo Miranda F.C. managers